Edward, Ed or Eddie Sutton may refer to:
Edward Sutton, 2nd Baron Dudley (c. 1460 – 1532), English nobleman
Edward Sutton, 4th Baron Dudley (1525–1586), English nobleman
Edward Sutton, 5th Baron Dudley (1567–1643), English nobleman
Ed Sutton (1935–2008), American football player
Eddie Sutton (1936–2020), American college basketball coach
Eddy Sutton (born 1948), English badminton player